Kargas (also known as Kargasar and Karkas) is a village in Dodangeh Rural District, Hurand District, Ahar County, East Azerbaijan Province, Iran. At the 2006 census, its population was 82, in 17 families.

References 

Populated places in Ahar County